The Atumpan is a type of Bono talking drum. Played in pairs, these drums provide the bass part in Adowa dance ensembles. These drums are also found in Fontomfrom ensembles.

Construction and functionality 

The body of the atumpan is made of wood, with a hollow interior. Its bottom is open, to increase its resonance. Its drumhead is made of animal hide that is stretched out to cover the top of the drum's body. There are several pegs near the top of the drum's body, which tension cords attached to them. These cords extend to the drumhead, holding it in place. Most atumpans are about 25 centimeters (8 inches) in width, and almost 60 centimeters (22 inches) high.

The atumpan is played either with one's bare hands or L-shaped sticks.

History 
The atumpan or ntumpane talking drum were introduced into Bonoman by Bonohene Akumfi Ameyaw I and Bonohemaa Owusuaa Abrafi around 1320s from North Africa.

References 

African drums
Ashanti musical instruments